Ammar Ali is an Iraqi wheelchair fencer. He represented Iraq at the Summer Paralympics in 2012, 2016 and 2021. He won the silver medal in the men's épée B event in 2016.

References

External links 
 

Living people
Year of birth missing (living people)
Place of birth missing (living people)
Iraqi male épée fencers
Wheelchair fencers at the 2012 Summer Paralympics
Wheelchair fencers at the 2016 Summer Paralympics
Wheelchair fencers at the 2020 Summer Paralympics
Medalists at the 2016 Summer Paralympics
Paralympic silver medalists for Iraq
Paralympic medalists in wheelchair fencing
Paralympic wheelchair fencers of Iraq
Iraqi male foil fencers